Robert Carter-Shaw (born 21 November 1941) is an English cricketer. He played one first-class match for Cambridge University Cricket Club in 1962.

See also
 List of Cambridge University Cricket Club players

References

External links
 

1941 births
Living people
English cricketers
Cambridge University cricketers
People from Berkhamsted